Zygaenosia eximia is a moth in the subfamily Arctiinae. It was described by Rothschild in 1936. It is found in Papua New Guinea.

References

Nudariina
Moths described in 1936
Zygaenosia